Los Caños de Meca is a small seaside village to the east of Cape Trafalgar on the Costa de la Luz of Spain.  It is part of the Province of Cádiz and the autonomous region of Andalusia.

Los Caños de Meca history is related to the Straits of Gibraltar, the Roman Fretus Herculeum and the Arab Boughaz el Tarek. Also the Battle of Trafalgar was fought near the coast of Caños de Meca, off the Cape of Trafalgar, over 200 years ago, 21 October 1805.

Notable people 
Muhadin Kishev, Soviet and Spanish artist, born 1938.

Municipalities of the Province of Cádiz
Costa de la Luz
Beaches of Andalusia
Towns in Spain
Populated places in the Province of Cádiz